Samuel Byrns (March 4, 1848 – July 9, 1914) was a U.S. Representative from Missouri.

Born on a farm in Jefferson County, Missouri, Byrns studied law.
He was admitted to the bar in 1872 and commenced practice in Hillsboro, Missouri.
He served as collector of revenue for Jefferson County in 1872.
He served as member of the State house of representatives in 1876 and 1877.
He served in the State senate in 1878.
He served as member of the Democratic State central committee 1886–1888.

Byrns was elected as a Democrat to the Fifty-second Congress (March 4, 1891 – March 3, 1893).
He was an unsuccessful candidate for renomination in 1892 to the Fifty-third Congress.
He resumed the practice of his chosen profession in De Soto, Missouri, where he died on July 9, 1914.
He was interred in Hillsboro Cemetery, Hillsboro, Missouri.

References

External links

1848 births
1914 deaths
Democratic Party members of the Missouri House of Representatives
Democratic Party Missouri state senators
Democratic Party members of the United States House of Representatives from Missouri
19th-century American politicians
People from Hillsboro, Missouri
People from De Soto, Missouri